Vattinagulapally is a village and panchayat in Ranga Reddy district, Telangana, India. Earlier this village was part of Rajendranagar mandal. Due to district reorganisation, it fell under the newly formed Gandipet mandal on 11 October 2016.

References

Villages in Ranga Reddy district